Hewittia is a monotypic genus of African crab spiders containing the single species, Hewittia gracilis. It was first described by R. de Lessert in 1928, and is found in the Congo.

See also
 List of Thomisidae species

References

Monotypic Araneomorphae genera
Spiders of Africa
Thomisidae